The 1941 Palestine Cup (HaGavia HaEretz-Israeli) was the twelfth season of Israeli Football Association's nationwide football cup competition. The defending holders were Beitar Tel Aviv.

The competition was delayed by disagreements within the EIFA, and instead of its usual start in early 1941 and finish at the end of the 1940–41 season, matches started on 20 September 1941, at the start of the 1941–42 season.

This competition saw a rise in the number of British and Arab teams, in part due to the heavy military presence in Palestine during the war. Among these teams were some ad hoc teams, assembled for the competition and named after the chairmen or captain. Despite this, and for the fourth time since the competition started, the two top Tel Aviv teams, Maccabi and Hapoel met in the final. Maccabi won 2–1 to earn its 4th cup.

Results

First round

Second round

Quarter-finals

Semi-finals

Final

Notes

References
100 Years of Football 1906-2006, Elisha Shohat (Israel), 2006
League and Cup Committee Protocol 2.10.1941 IFA

External links
 Israel Football Association website 

Israel State Cup
Cup
Israel State Cup seasons